Deep Jwele Jaai means "I keep on lightning the lamp". It may refer to:

Deep Jwele Jaai, a 1959 Bengali film starring Uttam Kumar and Suchitra Sen.
Deep Jwele Jaai (TV series), a Bengali TV serial aired on Zee Bangla from 2015 to 2017.

Disambiguation pages